Louisa Brownfield (born 14 April 1984), also known as Louisa Watson, is a former England netball international. She was a member of the England teams that won bronze medals at the 2006 and 2010 Commonwealth Games and at the 2011 World Netball Championships. Between 2006 and 2015, Brownfield also played for Mavericks in seven Netball Superleague grand finals, helping them win two titles in 2007–08 and 2011.

Early life and education
Brownfield is originally from Thundersley, Essex. She attended The Deanes School.

Playing career

London Hurricanes
During the Super Cup era, Brownfield played for London Hurricanes. Along with Abby Teare, Chioma Ezeogu and Sonia Mkoloma, she was a member of the Hurricanes team that lost to London Tornadoes in the 2003 Super Cup final.

Mavericks
Between 2006 and 2011, Brownfield played for Mavericks in six successive Netball Superleague grand finals. Brownfield was the top scorer in the grand final when Mavericks won their first Netball Superleague title in the 2007–08  after defeating Loughborough Lightning by 43–39. Other members of the team included Amanda Newton and Karen Atkinson. She was also top scorer in the 2009 and 2010 grand finals. Brownfield was captain when Mavericks' won their second Netball Superleague title in 2011 after defeating Surrey Storm by 57–46 in the grand final. Other members of the team included Karen Atkinson, Layla Guscoth and Lindsay Keable. In 2015 Brownfield played in her seventh grand final.

England
Brownfield was a member of the England teams that won bronze medals at the 2006 and 2010 Commonwealth Games and at the 2011 World Netball Championships. She made 55 senior appearances for England.

Honours

England
World Netball Series
Runners up: 2010: 1
Mavericks
Netball Superleague
Winners: 2007–08, 2011: 2
Runners up: 2005–06, 2006–07, 2008–09, 2009–10, 2015: 5
London Hurricanes
Super Cup
Runners up: 2003: 1

References

1984 births
Living people
English netball players
English netball coaches
Netball players at the 2006 Commonwealth Games
Netball players at the 2010 Commonwealth Games
Commonwealth Games bronze medallists for England
Commonwealth Games medallists in netball
AENA Super Cup players
Netball Superleague players
Mavericks netball players
Surrey Storm players
Sportspeople from Essex
2011 World Netball Championships players
Medallists at the 2006 Commonwealth Games
Medallists at the 2010 Commonwealth Games